Jay Mehta is a former Indian actor, who primarily worked in Hindi films and an Indian television producer, who works in soap opera. He is the managing director and creative head of Jay Production. He is the son of Hindi film producer late Pranlal Mehta.

Career

Jay Mehta was launched by Priyadarshan in Muskurahat, produced by Pranlal Mehta, the remake of Malayalam blockbuster Kilukkam opposite Revathi, but the film was termed as a box office disaster. His second release Zid (1994 film), that had the musical score of O.P.Nayyar also became a box office failure. Due to certain reasons he stepped down from his acting career and started producing television serials. As of now, he is a tv serial producer and currently his show ‘Gathbandhan’ is on air on colours.

Filmography

As actor
1992 - Muskurahat
1994 - Zid
1994 - Betaaj Badshah
1995 - Policewala Gunda
1996 - Mafia
1997 - Jeeo Shaan Se

As producer
2020 - Indiawaali Maa (TV Series)
2020 - Maddam Sir (TV Series)
2013/14 - TV Serial Ekk Nayi Pehchaan
2010 - Afia Megha Abhimanu Omar (associate producer)(TV Series)
2008 - Ardhangini - Ek Khoobsurat Jeevansathi (TV Series)
2000 - Tarkieb
1991 - 100 Days
1990 - Jawani Zindabad
1988 - Woh Phir Aayegi

References

External links
 
 https://jayproduction.co.in/

Male actors in Hindi cinema
Hindi film producers
Year of birth missing (living people)
Place of birth missing (living people)
Living people
20th-century Indian male actors